Jahmi'us Ramsey (born June 9, 2001) is an American professional basketball player for the Oklahoma City Blue of the NBA G League. He played college basketball for the Texas Tech Red Raiders.

High school career
As a freshman and sophomore, Ramsey played basketball for Mansfield Summit High School in his hometown of Arlington, Texas. Entering his junior season, he transferred to IMG Academy, a prominent prep school in Bradenton, Florida, where he played a national schedule and started drawing more college interest. For his senior year, Ramsey moved to Duncanville High School in Duncanville, Texas, after initially intending to join national powerhouse Oak Hill Academy. He averaged 21 points and six rebounds per game, leading his team to a Class 6A state championship.

On April 20, 2019, Ramsey posted 15 points, six rebounds, and two steals at the Jordan Brand Classic. On May 4, he shared most valuable player (MVP) honors with Isaiah Mobley at the Ballislife All-American Game.

Recruiting
Ramsey was considered a five-star recruit by Rivals and a four-star recruit by ESPN and 247Sports. On November 28, 2018, he committed to play college basketball for Texas Tech over Memphis and many other NCAA Division I programs. Ramsey became the highest-ranked recruit in school history and its first five-star recruit.

College career
On August 15, 2019, Ramsey recorded 44 points and 12 rebounds for Texas Tech in a 94–92 preseason win over Serbian professional team Mega Bemax on the Red Raiders International Tour in The Bahamas. He scored 19 points in his regular-season debut, an 85–60 win over Eastern Illinois. After scoring 27 points with five 3-pointers and six rebounds versus LIU, Ramsey was named Big 12 newcomer of the week on November 25, 2019. Ramsey injured his hamstring in a loss to Iowa on November 28 and missed several games. At the conclusion of the regular season, Ramsey was named Big 12 Freshman of the Year and Second Team All-Conference. Ramsey averaged 15 points, 4 rebounds, 2.2 assists and 1.3 steals per game.

On April 25, 2020, Ramsey declared he would be entering the 2020 NBA Draft.

Professional career

Sacramento Kings (2020–2022) 
On November 18, 2020, Ramsey was selected with the 43rd pick in the 2020 NBA draft by the Sacramento Kings. On December 4, 2020, he signed a multi-year contract with the Kings. On February 11, 2022, Ramsey was waived by the Kings.

Oklahoma City Blue (2022–present)
Following his release, Ramsey signed an NBA G League entry contract, and was picked up by the Birmingham Squadron off of waivers. He was traded to the Oklahoma City Blue the following day in exchange for Chasson Randle.

Career statistics

NBA

|-
| style="text-align:left;"| 
| style="text-align:left;"| Sacramento
| 13 || 0 || 7.2 || .395 || .263 || 1.000 || .8 || .5 || .3 || .1 || 3.1
|-
| style="text-align:left;"| 
| style="text-align:left;"| Sacramento
| 19 || 0 || 7.1 || .414 || .278 || .500 || .7 || .4 || .1 || .1 || 3.2
|- class="sortbottom"
| style="text-align:center;" colspan="2"| Career
| 32 || 0 || 7.1 || .406 || .270 || .632 || .7 || .4 || .2 || .1 || 3.1

College

|-
| style="text-align:left;"| 2019–20
| style="text-align:left;"| Texas Tech
| 27 || 27 || 31.2 || .442 || .426 || .641 || 4.0 || 2.2 || 1.3 || .7 || 15.0

References

External links
Texas Tech Red Raiders bio

2001 births
Living people
21st-century African-American sportspeople
African-American basketball players
Agua Caliente Clippers players
American men's basketball players
Basketball players from Texas
IMG Academy alumni
Sacramento Kings draft picks
Sacramento Kings players
Shooting guards
Sportspeople from Arlington, Texas
Stockton Kings players
Texas Tech Red Raiders basketball players